Aurelia Island is the 390 m long in west–east direction and 190 m wide rocky island lying off Limets Peninsula in northern Low Island in the South Shetland Islands, Antarctica.  Its coastline is highly indented.

The island is "named after the ocean fishing trawler Aurelia of the Bulgarian company Ocean Fisheries – Burgas that operated in Antarctic waters off South Georgia and the South Orkney Islands during its fishing trip under Captain Ivan Presnakov from September 1977 to April 1978.  The Bulgarian fishermen, along with those of the Soviet Union, Poland and East Germany are the pioneers of modern Antarctic fishing industry."

Location
British mapping in 2009.

Maps

 South Shetland Islands: Smith and Low Islands. Scale 1:150000 topographic map No. 13677. British Antarctic Survey, 2009
 Antarctic Digital Database (ADD). Scale 1:250000 topographic map of Antarctica. Scientific Committee on Antarctic Research (SCAR). Since 1993, regularly upgraded and updated

Notes

References
 Aurelia Island. SCAR Composite Gazetteer of Antarctica.
 Bulgarian Antarctic Gazetteer. Antarctic Place-names Commission. (details in Bulgarian, basic data in English)

External links
 Aurelia Island. Copernix satellite image

Islands of the South Shetland Islands
Ocean Fisheries – Burgas Co
Bulgaria and the Antarctic